Doug Stokes is a Professor in International Security and Strategy in the Department of Politics at the University of Exeter. He was born in 1972 in Hackney, East London. His father was a gardener and sign writer, his mother a cleaner and secretary. He was educated in London inner city state schools and left home at 17 and Hackney when 25. He completed his degree at London University in 1997, and lived and worked in the still conflict prone town of Brcko in Bosnia and returned to full time education in 2000 for his Masters and completed his PhD at Bristol in 2003. 

He has published a number of books and articles on US foreign policy, grand strategy and world order. His most recent books include an edited volume with Professor Michael Cox (of the London School of Economics) entitled US foreign policy (Oxford University Press, 2008; 2nd edition 2012; 3rd edition 2018) and Energy Security and American Hegemony (Johns Hopkins University Press in June 2010). Stokes is currently working on a new book on Transatlantic grand strategy, the ways in which the US can help stymie decline and the implications of US strategic retrenchment for European security. 

He is a senior research associate of Exeter's Strategy and Security Institute, member of the Royal Institute of International Affairs and Senior Associate Fellow at the Royal United Services Institute (RUSI).

References

External links 
 University of Exeter Doug Stokes entry 
 Doug Stokes at RUSI
 Works by Doug Stokes 

1972 births
Living people
Alumni of the University of London
Alumni of the University of Bristol
Academics of Aberystwyth University
Academics of the University of Exeter
Academics of the University of Kent